Down is a four-issue American comic book limited series published in late 2005 and early 2006, by Top Cow Productions, an imprint of Image Comics. The series was written by Warren Ellis and illustrated by Cully Hamner and Tony Harris.

Down tells the story of an undercover cop, sent on an unofficial mission to deal with a fellow officer who "went native" when infiltrating a drugs gang.

References

External links

2004 comics debuts
Comics by Warren Ellis